The 1981 New Orleans Saints season was the Saints' fifteenth season in the National Football League. Hoping past success would bring a bright future to New Orleans the Saints hired Bum Phillips to be their new head coach. With the first pick overall the Saints draft Heisman Trophy winner George Rogers out of South Carolina. Phillips banked on Rogers giving the Saints the same boost that Earl Campbell did when Phillips drafted him out of Texas three years earlier.

Rogers won the Offensive Rookie of the Year, as he rushed all-time rookie record of 1,674 yards, a record which was eclipsed just two years later when Eric Dickerson of the Los Angeles Rams rushed for 1,808. However, the Saints would continue to struggle finishing with a 4–12 record. It was the Saints’ thirteenth of fifteen seasons with five or fewer wins, and eighth with double-digit defeats.

Despite finishing with a poor record, they did have a couple bright moments, such as defeating the eventual AFC Champion Cincinnati Bengals in the Superdome and defeating the Houston Oilers, Bum Phillips' old team, on the road. 

New Orleans swept the NFC West division rival Los Angeles Rams for the first time since they were placed in the same division for the 1970 season.

Offseason

NFL draft

Personnel

Staff

Roster

Regular season

Schedule 

Note: Intra-division opponents are in bold text.

Standings

Awards and records 
 George Rogers, NFL rushing title, 1,674 yards
 George Rogers, franchise record, most rushing yards by a rookie, 1,674 yards
 George Rogers, NFL Record (since broken), most rushing yards by a rookie, 1,674 yards

References

External links 
 Saints on Pro Football Reference
 Saints on jt-sw.com

New Orleans
New Orleans Saints seasons
New